Jonathan Miller (born on 11 June 1998), is a collegiate Bahamian football player who plays for the Bahamian national team. He made his international debut against Belize, resulting in a 4–0 loss in the CONCACAF Nations League competition.

References

1998 births
Living people
Bahamian footballers
Bahamas international footballers
Association football defenders